Edwin Sylvester Luke (July 23, 1911 – January 18, 1986) was a Chinese American character actor who had a career in Hollywood during the 1940s and 1950s. He played Charlie Chan's Number Four Son, Eddie Chan, in the 1945 feature "The Jade Mask", starring Sydney Toler. He was the younger brother of actor Keye Luke. He was one of three Asian Americans - the first cohort - to receive Bachelor's degrees in journalism from the University of Washington in 1936. While a student there, he played on the championship team in the Northwest Chinese Basketball Tournament. Subsequently, he was the first Chinese American member of the International Typographical Union (Los Angeles #174) in 1941. In addition to acting, he also worked for The Hollywood Reporter as a typographer, writer, editor and later forged a successful career as a social worker for Los Angeles County. In the 2012 award winning short film "Keye Luke", by Taiwanese-American Director Timothy Tau, Edwin Luke was portrayed by actor Archie Kao.

Filmography

References 

 

 

1911 births
1986 deaths
20th-century American male actors
American male actors of Chinese descent
American male film actors
Male actors from Seattle